Lewisham Council could refer to:

Lewisham London Borough Council, created in 1965
Lewisham Metropolitan Borough Council, 1900 to 1965
Lewisham District Board of Works, 1855 to 1900